Willi Soukop  (5 January 1907 – 8 February 1995) was a sculptor, member of the Royal Academy and early teacher of Elisabeth Frink. Soukop's work is prominently on display at Hull University in front of the Brynmor Jones Library. The older section has two exterior bas-relief sculptures by Willi Soukop, one is of an owl, the other shows a human figure representing the light of knowledge and is positioned directly over the main entrance.

References

Sources 
 Buckman, D., 1998
 Nairne, S. and Serota, N. (eds), 1981
 Spalding, F., 1990
 Strachan, W.J., 1984
 Obituary, The Times, 9 February 1995

1907 births
1995 deaths
English sculptors
English male sculptors
Austrian sculptors
Austrian male sculptors
Austrian emigrants to the United Kingdom
Royal Academicians
Academy of Fine Arts Vienna alumni
20th-century British sculptors